St. Mary's Episcopal Church is a historicchurch at 115 S. Main Street in Monticello, Arkansas. The modest -story wood-frame Gothic Revival structure was built in 1906. When built it had a castellated tower, but this was removed at an unknown date. Because of declining participation, the Episcopal Church sold it in 1938 to Victor Borchardt, who operated a radio and appliance repair business there, making numerous alterations to the building. Changes made included the removal of Gothic-style lancet windows, a gabled front porch, and the introduction of a mezzanine and second floor in portions of the building.

The church was extensively restored in 1995. and listed on the National Register of Historic Places the following year.

See also
National Register of Historic Places listings in Drew County, Arkansas

References

Episcopal church buildings in Arkansas
Churches on the National Register of Historic Places in Arkansas
Carpenter Gothic church buildings in Arkansas
Churches completed in 1906
Churches in Drew County, Arkansas
National Register of Historic Places in Drew County, Arkansas
1906 establishments in Arkansas